PGL2 may refer to
SDHAF2, a gene on chromosome 11 in humans
for the group  in mathematics, see projective linear group and modular group